Kristina Valeryevna Gorshkova (born 18 February 1989) is a Russian former competitive ice dancer. With partner Vitali Butikov, she is the 2008 World Junior bronze medalist.

Gorshkova began skating at age four and switched from singles to ice dancing at age ten. After their coach, Tatiana Kuzmina, was killed in a car accident in July 2007, Gorshkova and Butikov began working with Elena Tchaikovskaia, Ksenia Rumiantseva, and Petr Durnev.

Gorshkova is studying Cultural and Social Anthropology at the University of Latvia.

Programs 
(with Butikov)

Competitive highlights
(with Butikov)

References

External links

 

Figure skaters from Moscow
Living people
Russian female ice dancers
1989 births
World Junior Figure Skating Championships medalists
Universiade medalists in figure skating
Universiade gold medalists for Russia
Competitors at the 2009 Winter Universiade
Competitors at the 2011 Winter Universiade